Seduction is the fifth studio album by Panamian singer-songwriter Flex. It was released on November 6, 2015, through Sony Music. The single Nadie Como Tú was peaked at 20 in Billboard Latin Pop Airplay. Currently, the artist is promoting his latest single "Immortal" and for March 2016 will release their official videoclip.

Track listing

References

External links
Official website

2015 albums
Flex (singer) albums
Spanish-language albums
Sony Music albums